Khusrau Shah Kokultash was a general of the Mughal Empire. Before Babur, the Mughal emperor, rose to power, he was an Indian Emir. Khusrau Shah paid homage and fealty to Babur on his ascent and commanded the left wing of his army at the Battle of Khanwa.

References 

Indian nobility
Indian generals
Emirs
Mughal generals
His son-in-;aw was Mir Ayub son of Alacha khan